Otbiçen (Kurdish: Kimilo) is a village in the Ardahan District, Ardahan Province, Turkey. Its population is 211 (2021).

References

Villages in Ardahan District